Popillia cupricollis is a species of scarab beetles.

Description
Body is smooth and elongate in shape with quite stout black legs. Pronotum is shining metallic blackish with coppery reflections (hence the Latin species name cupricollis meaning coppery neck), while elytra are orange. The punctures at the sides of pronotum are coarse and strong.

Distribution and habitat

References

Rutelinae
Beetles described in 1831